Milton Holmes Welling (January 25, 1876 – May 28, 1947) was a U.S. Representative from Utah.

Born in Farmington, Utah Territory, Welling attended the common schools, the Latter-day Saints' University, and the University of Utah, the last of which he received a degree from.  From 1896 to 1898 Welling served as a missionary for the Church of Jesus Christ of Latter-day Saints (LDS Church) in the church's Southern States Mission.

He engaged in agricultural and mercantile pursuits and also in banking.  Starting in 1902, Welling was the president of the LDS Church's Malad Stake headquartered in Malad, Idaho.
He was elected a member of the board of trustees of Brigham Young College, Logan, Utah, in 1906.

When the Bear River Stake of the LDS Church, based in Garland, Utah was organized in 1908, Welling became its first president.  He served in this calling until 1917.

Welling served in the Utah House of Representatives from 1911 to 1915.

Welling was elected as a Democrat to the Sixty-fifth and Sixty-sixth Congresses (March 4, 1917 – March 3, 1921).
He did not seek renomination, but was an unsuccessful Democratic candidate for the United States Senate in 1920.

Welling served as director of registration for the State of Utah 1925–1928.  Welling also served as president of the Bear River Stake again from 1925–1929.

Welling was elected secretary of state of Utah in 1928. He was reelected in 1932 and served until January 1, 1937. Meanwhile, he served on the Board of Trustees of Utah State Agricultural College from 1926 to 1936 and as a Regent over the University of Utah from 1928 to 1936. After fulfilling these responsibilities, Welling was appointed by Secretary of Interior Harold L. Ickes to make a survey of public grazing lands in 1937 and 1938. Later, he resumed agricultural and mining operations.

In January 1943, Welling accepted war service appointment as auditor with Army Air Forces and also served with the War Assets Administration at Salt Lake City, Utah, until his death May 28, 1947.
He was interred in Fielding Cemetery, Fielding, Utah.

Sources

References

1876 births
1947 deaths
American leaders of the Church of Jesus Christ of Latter-day Saints
American Mormon missionaries in the United States
Democratic Party members of the Utah House of Representatives
University of Utah alumni
Utah State University people
People from Farmington, Utah
19th-century Mormon missionaries
Ensign College alumni
Democratic Party members of the United States House of Representatives from Utah
Latter Day Saints from Utah
Secretaries of State of Utah